Episcopate can refer to
 the rank or fact of being a bishop
 a group of bishops that together form a historical episcopate
 episcopal polity, a form of organization of a Christian church